Kazuki (written: , , , , , , , ,  or  in hiragana) is a masculine Japanese given name. Notable people with the name include:

, Japanese wrestler
, Japanese anime director
, Japanese footballer
, Japanese footballer
, Japanese footballer
, Japanese baseball player
, Japanese footballer
, Japanese actor and singer
, Japanese shogi player
, Japanese actor
, Japanese swimmer
, Japanese motorcycle racer
, Japanese racing driver
, Japanese ski jumper
, Japanese film director and screenwriter
, Japanese comedian
, Japanese footballer
, Japanese footballer
, Japanese footballer
, Japanese actor
, Japanese manga artist and game creator
, Japanese baseball player
, Japanese footballer
, Japanese mixed martial artist
, Japanese musician
, Japanese figure skater
, Japanese sumo wrestler
Kazuki Watanabe (disambiguation), multiple people
, Japanese conductor
Kazuki Yamaguchi (disambiguation), multiple people
, Japanese voice actor and actor
Kazuki Yazawa (born 1989), Japanese slalom canoeist
, Japanese baseball player
, Japanese speed skater
, Japanese sumo wrestler

Fictional characters
Kazuki Kasen, fictional character in the video game Grand Theft Auto Liberty City Stories
Kazuki Kazama, a character in the video game Samurai Shodown
Kazuki Fuse, protagonist of the anime film Jin-Roh: The Wolf Brigade
Kazuki Shimada, a supporting character in A Silent Voice
, protagonist of the manga series Buso Renkin

Japanese masculine given names